Jordan Ponticelli (born 10 September 1998) is an English professional footballer who plays as a forward for National League North club King's Lynn Town.

Career
Ponticelli began his career for Hinckley Leicester Road.

Ponticelli made his professional debut in a 3–1 EFL Cup loss to Blackburn Rovers on 8 August 2017.

Ponticelli made his Football League debut as a substitute in the 85th minute of a 0–0 draw against Barnet on 7 October 2017.

In August 2018, Jordan joined EFL League Two side Macclesfield Town on a season-long loan deal. The loan was terminated in January 2019.

On 10 July 2019, Ponticelli went out on loan again, this time joining League One club Tranmere Rovers on a six-month loan deal.

Ponticelli dropped down two divisions for his next loan, signing for National League club Wrexham on 22 January 2020 until the end of the 2019–20 season. Ponticelli joined Wrexham in a permanent deal in August 2020. 
 Ponticelli was released at the end of the 2021–22 season.

In July 2022, Ponticelli joined National League North club King's Lynn Town following their relegation.

Career statistics

Honours
Coventry City
EFL League Two play-offs: 2018

Wrexham
FA Trophy runner-up: 2021–22

References

1998 births
Living people
Sportspeople from Nuneaton
Association football forwards
English footballers
English people of Italian descent
Hinckley Leicester Road F.C. players
Coventry City F.C. players
Macclesfield Town F.C. players
Tranmere Rovers F.C. players
Wrexham A.F.C. players
King's Lynn Town F.C. players
English Football League players
National League (English football) players